The Mirror is a 1915 silent short dramatic film directed by Joseph Kaufman and produced by the Lubin Manufacturing Company in Philadelphia.

Cast
Crane Wilbur — The Mountaineer
Ethel Clayton — The Mountain Girl
Thurston Hall — The Rival
Bartley McCullum — The Doctor
Mary Carr — The Rival's Invalid Mother (*as Mrs. Carr)

References

External links
 The Mirror at IMDb.com

1915 films
American silent short films
American black-and-white films
Lost American films
Lubin Manufacturing Company films
Silent American drama films
1915 drama films
1915 lost films
Lost drama films
Films directed by Joseph Kaufman
1910s American films